Rezgiukai (formerly ) is a village in Kėdainiai district municipality, in Kaunas County, in central Lithuania. According to the 2011 census, the village was uninhabited.

History
At the end of the 19th century there were two Rezgiukai zaścianki, one of them belonged to the Jelenskiai, another to the Gailiavičiai.

Demography

References

Villages in Kaunas County
Kėdainiai District Municipality